Senior general is the highest rank in Myanmar Armed Forces. It is held by the Commander-in-Chief of Defence Services (CinCDS). Since 2011, a person appointed as CinCDS has to be quickly promoted one higher rank every year until he get the rank of Senior general.

The rank insignia of Senior general is with a big star surrounded by a flower branch and with four small stars. Its rank medal and car insignia show that it is the five-star general rank, and the flag of CinCDS confirms it. The rank of Senior general is two ranks higher than that of a General (a full General), but in terms of stars, the Senior general has only one more star than the General.

The Senior general rank exists in all branches: Myanmar Army, Myanmar Navy and Myanmar Air Force, but all these ranks are to be held by the same person at a time no matter from which branch he was promoted. A person holding the rank of Senior general can wear any uniform from all these branches.

History 
In 1990, the Myanmar Armed Forces expanded its structure, and the then Commander-in-Chief General Saw Maung promoted himself to Senior General rank on 18 March 1990. Thus, he became the first person to hold the rank of Senior general.

List of rank holders

References 

Five-star officers
Military ranks of Myanmar